Nagpur  has a population of 4.6 million. It is the 13th largest urban agglomeration in India, according to figures from the 2001 census of India.

Localities:

Mahal — The oldest locality in Nagpur. Nagpur was founded here by Raja Bakht Buland Shah. The Bhonsle Rajwada is also located here.
Sitabuldi 
Ganesh Peth colony 
Dhantoli
Trimurti Nagar  
Itwari 
Mominpura
Dharampeth
Ramdaspeth
Shraddhanand Peth
Sadar
Civil Lines
Gandhibagh
Nandanvan
Kalamna
Wardhaman Nagar
Seminary Hills
Police Line Takli
Mankapur
Pachpaoli
Vayusena Nagar
Ravi Nagar
Byramji Town
Chaoni
Mangalwari
Gaddi Godam
Gitti Khadan
Pratap Nagar
Ajni
Pardi
Indora
Maskasath
Jaripatka
Kapil Nagar
Ashok Nagar
Gokulpeth
Giripeth
Bajaj Nagar
Rajendra Nagar
Lakadganj
Gandhinagar
Manish Nagar
Bezanbagh
Bhandewadi
Rahate Colony
New Pawan Shakti Nagar
Jafar Nagar
Friends Colony
Baba Farid Nagar
Suyog Nagar
Sahyog Nagar

References

Neighbourhoods in Nagpur
Nagpur-related lists
Nagpur